This is a list of election results for the electoral district of Murray-Mallee in South Australian elections.

Members for Murray-Mallee

Election results

Elections in the 1980s

References

South Australian state electoral results by district